Magnetic induction may refer to:

 electromagnetic induction – a physical phenomenon where a changing magnetic field produces an electric field
 magnetic flux density – a physical quantity describing the magnitude and direction of the magnetic field